Courtney Hurley (born September 30, 1990) is an American fencer.  She won a bronze medal in the women's team épée alongside Maya Lawrence, Susie Scanlan, and Kelley Hurley at the 2012 Summer Olympics. A standout at the University of Notre Dame, she was a 4-time All-American. She has qualified to represent the United States in fencing at the 2020 Olympics in Tokyo in 2021.

Coached by her father, Bob Hurley, Courtney has competed since age 15 with her older sister Kelley internationally: at the 2012 Summer Olympics, they were the part of the first U.S. Women's Épée Team to earn an Olympic medal, a bronze. Following the 2016 Summer Olympics, they are training arduously for the 2020 Summer Olympics in Tokyo.

See also
List of USFA Division I National Champions

References

American female épée fencers
1990 births
Living people
Fencers at the 2012 Summer Olympics
Fencers at the 2016 Summer Olympics
Olympic bronze medalists for the United States in fencing
Medalists at the 2012 Summer Olympics
Pan American Games medalists in fencing
Pan American Games gold medalists for the United States
Pan American Games silver medalists for the United States
Universiade medalists in fencing
Sportspeople from Houston
Notre Dame Fighting Irish fencers
Fencers at the 2011 Pan American Games
Universiade silver medalists for the United States
Medalists at the 2011 Summer Universiade
Medalists at the 2011 Pan American Games
Fencers at the 2020 Summer Olympics
21st-century American women